The Bureau of Global Public Affairs is a bureau of the United States Department of State that communicates the department's policy decisions to the public. The bureau was formed on May 28, 2019, in a merger between the Bureau of Public Affairs and the Bureau of International Information Programs. It is led by the Assistant Secretary of State for Global Public Affairs.

See also 
 Public diplomacy

References

External links 
 Official Website

United States
Public relations in the United States
Global Public Affairs